Tolochko is a surname. Notable people with the surname include:

 Petro Tolochko (born 1938), Soviet and Ukrainian historian, archaeologist, and political activist
 Roman Tolochko (born 1998), Ukrainian footballer 

Ukrainian-language surnames